Lindsay Ann Deutsch is an American violinist. A native of Houston, Texas, Deutsch moved to Los Angeles at age 15 to pursue her musical career.

Deutsch made her solo orchestral debut at the age of 11 with the Clear Lake Symphony in Texas.  Deutsch has performed throughout the U.S. and Canada with such symphonies as the  Los Angeles Chamber Orchestra, California Philharmonic, Colorado Symphony Orchestra, Fort Worth Symphony, San Diego Chamber Orchestra, Knoxville Symphony, Boulder Chamber Orchestra, New West Symphony, McGill Chamber Orchestra in Montreal, National Academy Orchestra, and Oakville Symphony in Ontario, Canada.

In 2018, Deutsch began touring with Yanni as a featured violinist during his "Yanni 25 – Live At The Acropolis Anniversary Concert Tour", performing with him in Saudi Arabia and the United States. Deutsch also performs with a crossover group, piano trio TAKE3.

Deutsch is actively involved in outreach programs such as "Classics Alive", to present classical music to young audiences and revitalize classical music in general.

Deutsch's movie credits include the violin sound track in the 2006 movie The Good Shepherd starring Robert De Niro.

Deutsch received national attention in April 2005 when her 1742 Sanctus Seraphin violin, on loan from the Mandell Collection of Southern California, valued at $850,000, was stolen from her car. It was returned five days later after she offered a $10,000 reward.

In addition to her music, in her early years, Lindsay Deutsch won the gold medal in the World Junior Olympic Racquetball Championships in 1997 and was selected to the 2000 U.S Junior Olympic Racquetball Team.

Lindsay Deutsch graduated from the Colburn School of Music in Los Angeles where she studied with Robert Lipsett.

References

External links

 

American classical violinists
Classical musicians from Texas
People from Houston
Living people
1984 births
21st-century classical violinists
Women classical violinists